The Campeonato Brasileiro Sub-17, is the official Brazilian national football tournament for U-17 teams.

List of champions

Following there are all the championship editions:

Titles by club

See also
 Campeonato Brasileiro Sub-23
 Campeonato Brasileiro Sub-20
 Copa do Brasil Sub-17

References

External links
Brasileiro U-17 at Soccerway

5
Youth football competitions in Brazil
5
Under-17 association football
Sports leagues established in 2019